Ural Akbulut (born 1945) is a professor of chemistry at METU. He had been METU's president from 2002 to 2008. During his presidency, he was involved in a debate with Melih Gökçek regarding the water problem of Ankara.

He coined the word e-memorandum to describe military statements published on the Turkish Armed Forces' website regarding the 2007 Turkish presidential election. Presently, he is a columnist at Milliyet newspaper.

References 

1945 births
Living people
Rectors of Middle East Technical University
Date of birth missing (living people)
Place of birth missing (living people)